A mutant is a biological entity which has undergone a change in its genetic structure.

Mutant or mutants may also refer to:

Books and comics
Mutant (Marvel Comics), a human being who is born with genetic modifications that allow for abilities not possessed by regular humans
Mutant (short story collection), a collection of science fiction short stories by Lewis Padgett
Mutants (short story collection), a collection of short stories by Gordon R. Dickson
Mutants in fiction, a common trope in science fiction and comic books
Mutants: On Genetic Variety and the Human Body, a book by Armand Marie Leroi
The Mutants, by Kris Neville 1966
The Mutants, by Berni Wrightson 1980

Film and TV
Mutant, a 1982 science fiction/horror film better known as Forbidden World
Mutant (film), a 1984 horror film
Mutants (2008 film), American film with Michael Ironside
Mutants (2009 film), French film
The Mutants (film), a 1998 Portuguese film
Mutant Chronicles (film), a 2008 American film

Television
"The Mutant", a 1964 episode of The Outer Limits
The Mutants, another title used for the 1963 Doctor Who serial The Daleks, not to be confused with the 1972 serial below
The Mutants, a 1972 Doctor Who serial
"Mutants", a 2004 episode of The Mighty Boosh

Games
Mutant (role-playing game), a series of Swedish role-playing games developed and published by Target Games
Mutant (role-playing game 1984) or "Old Mutant", the original release
 Mutants: Genetic Gladiators, a 2014 Kobojo game

Music

Bands
The Mutants (San Francisco band), a punk rock band
The Mutants (UK band), a punk rock musical collaboration with an all-star cast of guest musicians

Albums
Mutant (album), a 2015 album by Arca
Mutant Vol. 2, a follow-up album to the Man's Myth Vol. 1 album (collectively known as Man's Myth & Mutant) by horror-core band Twiztid
Mutants (album), a 2010 album by John Dahlbäck

Other uses
Mutant (human)
CMMG Mk47 Mutant, an American-made semi-automatic rifle

See also
Os Mutantes, a Brazilian psychedelic rock band
Os Mutantes (album), the band's eponymous 1968 debut album
Mutantes (album), a 1969 album by Os Mutantes
Mutation (disambiguation)